Ichusa Creek is a stream in the U.S. state of Mississippi. It is a tributary to the Leaf River.

Ichusa is a name derived from the Choctaw language meaning "little river". A variant name is "Hatchushe Creek".

References

Rivers of Mississippi
Rivers of Smith County, Mississippi
Rivers of Scott County, Mississippi
Mississippi placenames of Native American origin